Synaptotanais notabilis is a species of malacostracan in the family Tanaididae.

References

 Sieg, Jürgen, and Richard N. Winn (1981). "The Tanaidae (Crustacea; Tanaidacea) of California, with a key to the world genera". Proceedings of the Biological Society of Washington, vol. 94, no. 2, 315-343.

Tanaidacea
Crustaceans described in 1981